Sadia Kabeya (born 22 February 2002) is an English rugby union player. She plays for England internationally and Loughborough Lightning in the Premier 15s.

Early life and education 
A talented teenage field athlete, Kabeya was first introduced to rugby at school at  Harris City Academy in Croydon, where her PE teacher was Bryony Cleall. Developing an interest in the game, she joined Streatham-Croydon RFC as a teenager.

Club career 
Kabeya first played for Richmond Women before moving to Wasps Women and then Loughborough Lightning.

International career 
In September 2019 Kabeya captained England U18s in the 2019 Rugby Europe Women's U18 Sevens Championship. She made her international debut for the senior England 15s team on 14 November 2021 against Canada and played against Italy as England took the grand slam in the 2022 Women's Six Nations Championship.

In September 2021, Kabeya was named in the England squad for the COVID-delayed 2021 Rugby World Cup and started in the opening game against Fiji, where she was named Player of the Match.

References 

Living people
2002 births
England women's international rugby union players
English female rugby union players